This is a partial list of molecules that contain 4 carbon atoms.

See also
 Four-carbon molecule listing all hydrocarbons
 Carbon number 
 List of compounds with carbon number 3
 List of compounds with carbon number 5

C04